The Worrall Covered Bridge, also known as the Woralls Bridge is a wooden covered bridge carrying Williams Road across the Williams River in Rockingham, Vermont, United States.  Built about 1870, it is the only surviving 19th-century covered bridge in the town, after the Hall Covered Bridge collapsed in 1980 and was replaced in 1982, and the Bartonsville Covered Bridge was washed away by Hurricane Irene in 2011 and replaced in 2012-2013.  The bridge was listed on the National Register of Historic Places in 1973.

Description and history
The Worrall Covered Bridge is located on Williams Road, a dirt road a short distance north of Vermont Route 103, that generally parallels the Williams River on its north side, while VT 103 follows the river on the south side. The trusses rest on stone abutments that have been reinforced with concrete, and the road bed ( wide, or one lane) has been reinforced with laminated beams. It is topped by a gabled metal roof, and is sheathed in vertical board siding, with openings on its south side to improve traffic visibility. The bridge includes one rare feature — a wooden ramp leading up to the northwest entrance.

The bridge was built in 1870 by Sanford Granger, a local master builder.  Of seventeen 19th-century bridges once located in the town, it is the only one that remains.  At the time of its National Register listing in 1973, there were three such bridges in Rockingham, but the other two have since been destroyed and replaced with new covered bridges (see above).

See also
National Register of Historic Places listings in Windham County, Vermont
List of bridges on the National Register of Historic Places in Vermont
List of covered bridges in Vermont

References

External links
 

Covered bridges on the National Register of Historic Places in Vermont
Buildings and structures in Rockingham, Vermont
Bridges completed in 1870
Wooden bridges in Vermont
Covered bridges in Windham County, Vermont
National Register of Historic Places in Windham County, Vermont
Road bridges on the National Register of Historic Places in Vermont
Lattice truss bridges in the United States